Motor neuron and pancreas homeobox 1 (MNX1), also known as Homeobox HB9 (HLXB9), is a human protein encoded by the MNX1 gene.

Clinical significance 

Mutations in the MNX1 gene are associated with Currarino syndrome. Upregulated expression of MNX1-AS1 long noncoding RNA predicts poor prognosis in gastric cancer.

References

Further reading

External links 
 

Transcription factors